Cautiva (English title:Captive) is a Mexican telenovela produced by Francisco Burillo for Televisa in 1986. It starred Julio Alemán, Lucy Gallardo, Otto Sirgo, Magda Guzmán, Claudia Córdova and Cecilia Toussaint.

Plot
Javier and Amanda Arellano are an exemplary couple living in Monterrey with his two daughters, Patricia and Diana. Or at least, appear to be copies, because in reality the marriage is broken. Living apart for a long time, and Javier just looking affairs with other women while Amanda tolerate the situation for fear of damaging their daughters.

While Patricia is a young scholar and correctly attached to her mother, her sister Diana is rebellious and spoiled, spends all his time lazing and devising mischief with her friend Marcela and feeling extreme adoration for his father. The friendship with her friend Marcela is completed when you discover that Diana killed Marcela's father.

Javier is proud of Diana, for his character and determination are a reflection for him, in the absence of a son he always wanted but could never hit Amanda. The submissive Amanda just looking to reconcile with her husband because of the love he has always had. However, when she learns that her husband's mistress is his secretary Graciela, suffers a nervous breakdown, which greatly concerned with Patricia and Aurelia, his faithful servant that has always accompanied.

Cast 

Julio Alemán as Javier Arellano
Lucy Gallardo as Amanda Arellano
Otto Sirgo as Daniel
Magda Guzmán as Aurelia
Claudia Córdova as Diana Arellano
Cecilia Toussaint as Patricia Arellano
Andrea Ferrari as Marcela
Silvia Manríquez as Graciela
Julio Monterde as Andrés
Sara Guasch as Elvira
Eduardo Palomo as Enrique 
Miguel Ángel Ferriz as Gilberto 
Miguel Macía as Jacinto 
Luis Couturier as Marcelo
Lucero Lander as Mariana
Ernesto Laguardia as Sergio
Rocío Yaber as Alicia
Alejandra Peniche as Gloria
Eduardo Liñán as Roldán
Mónica Prado as Sonia
Pablo Salvatella as Aguilar
Benjamín Islas as Hernán
Bárbara Córcega as Carmen
Blanca Torres as Esperanza
Antonio Ruiz as Pepe Toño
Humberto Herrán as Bermeo
Guillermo Zarur as Rodrigo
Miguel Gutiérrez as Manuel
Claudia Ramírez as Gabriela
Tere Cornejo as Raquel
Juan Carlos Barreto as Alfonso
Isaura Espinoza
Paco Mauri 
Roberto Spriu
Ilse as Herself
Ivonne as Herself
Mimi as Herself 
Constantino Costas

Awards

References

External links

Mexican telenovelas
1986 telenovelas
1986 Mexican television series debuts
1986 Mexican television series endings
Spanish-language telenovelas
Television shows set in Mexico
Televisa telenovelas